Lara Strongman is a curator, writer and art historian from New Zealand.

Biography 
Strongman studied art history at the University of Canterbury, graduating with a master of art's degree in 1991. In 2012 she completed a PhD in art history at Victoria University of Wellington (2012).

Strongman held the position of deputy director at City Gallery Wellington until her appointment as senior curator at Christchurch Art Gallery Te Puna o Waiwhetu in 2014. In 2019 she was appointed director of curatorial and digital at the Museum of Contemporary Art, Sydney.

References 

University of Canterbury alumni
Victoria University of Wellington alumni
New Zealand art historians
New Zealand curators

20th-century births
Year of birth missing (living people)
Living people
New Zealand women curators